Kashmiriyat (also spelled as Kashmiriat) is the centuries-old indigenous tradition of communal harmony and religious syncretism in the Kashmir Valley in the Indian-administered union territory of Jammu and Kashmir. Emerging around the 16th century, it is characterised by religious and cultural harmony, patriotism and pride for their mountainous homeland of Kashmir. 

Kashmiriyat exemplifies the joint Hindu-Muslim culture, festivals, language, cuisine and clothing in the Kashmir Valley. In the spirit of Kashmiriyat, festivals of Hinduism and Islam are celebrated by adherents of both faiths. Kashmiriyat, with the Hindu-Muslim unity it encourages, was promoted by Kashmiri sultan Zain-ul-Abidin; the story of the Kashmiri mystic Lal Ded (also called Lalleswari), in which her body turned into a mound of flowers that was buried by both Hindus and Muslims, serves as an emblem of Kashmiriyat that keeps it alive today.

In recent 2007 poll conducted by the Centre for the Study of Developing Societies in New Delhi, 84 percent of people in Srinagar want to see the return of Kashmiri Pandits. A 2001 MORI survey of popular opinion in the then-state of Jammu and Kashmir, including the Kashmir Valley, found 92% respondents opposed to the state being divided on the basis of religion or ethnicity. However, scholar Christopher Snedden states that the concept of Kashmiriyat has been 'romanticised' and Kashmiriyat could not prevent antipathy and rivalry between the Kashmiri Pandits and the Kashmiri Muslims.

Origins

The disputed territory of Kashmir enjoys significant ethnic, cultural and religious diversity. The region has historically been an important centre for Hinduism and Buddhism. Islam made inroads in medieval times, and Sikhism also spread to the region under the rule of the Sikh Empire in the 18th and 19th centuries. Kashmir has a significant place in the mythology and history of Hinduism and Buddhism. The region is home to many legendary Hindu and Buddhist monuments and institutions. The Hazratbal shrine houses a relic that is believed to be the hair of Muhammad, the prophet of Islam. In his journeys seeking religious enlightenment, Guru Nanak travelled to Kashmir. Kashmiris believe that the ideas of Kashmiriyat the rule of Sultan Zain ul Abedin, who gave equal protection, importance and patronage to Kashmir's different religious communities. The tale of the Kashmiri mystic Lal Ded, whose body is said to have turned into a mound of flowers that was buried by both Hindus and Muslims, is an ancient emblem of the spirit of Kashmiriyat.

Philosophy

Kashmir's existence is characterised by its insular Himalayan geography, harsh winter climate and isolation in economic and political terms. The region has also seen political turmoil and foreign invasions. Kashmiriyat is believed to be an expression of solidarity, resilience and patriotism regardless of religious differences. It is believed to embody an ethos of harmony and a determination of survival of the people and their heritage. To many Kashmiris, Kashmiriyat demanded religious and social harmony and brotherhood. It has been strongly influenced by Kashmir Shaivism, Buddhism and Sufism, carrying a long-standing conviction that any and every religion will lead to the same divine goal.

Kashmir was also influenced by the Mughal emperor Akbar's genesis of a syncretic philosophy of Din-i-Illahi, which emphasized the blending of Hindu and Muslim ideals and values. Works in the Kashmiri language, art, culture and literature strongly expound and emphasize Kashmiriyat as a way of life. However, the impact and importance of Kashmiriyat has been concentrated in the Kashmir Valley only, which is the real historical Kashmir. The farther regions of Gilgit, Baltistan, Jammu and Ladakh have not been influenced by this philosophy, as these regions are not Kashmiri in terms of culture, language or ethnicity.

Notable examples
Muslims, Hindus and Sikhs celebrate the annual Sufi festival of urs together in the Indian union territory of Jammu and Kashmir.

Kashmiri Muslim carpet weavers have designed carpets that feature the Hindu deities Durga, Lakshmi and Saraswati.

Every year on 16 July, the Jwalamukhi Fair is held in the city of Khrew, which hosts the Jwala Ji Mandir, and is attended by Kashmiri Hindus and Kashmiri Muslims.

During the celebration of Eid, it is common for Hindus to wish their Muslim neighbours, a practice that Pran Koul states exemplified the "culture of Kashmiriyat in full".

Modern challenges

The culture and ethos of Kashmiriyat was greatly eroded at the onset of the Kashmir conflict, when the region was claimed by Pakistan and India and its territory divided during the Indo-Pakistani War of 1947. In the political debate on sovereignty over Kashmir, some interpret Kashmiriyat as nationalism and an expression for political independence from both Pakistan and India. The onset of militancy in Kashmir from 1989 has led to the exodus of almost all Hindus from Kashmir and violent attacks against the remaining communities of Hindus and Sikhs, further eroding the fabric of Kashmiriyat. Amidst the wider dispute between India and Pakistan. Conscious efforts to revive Kashmiriyat have been made by various communities of Muslims and Hindus through united opposition to violence in the state. Efforts to promote Kashmiriyat through cultural activities, social programmes and literature have increased throughout Jammu and Kashmir and amongst expatriate Kashmiri communities.

See also 
 Composite nationalism
 Punjabiyat, a similar tradition of multi-religious unity in the neighbouring Punjab region
 Ganga-Jamuni tehzeeb
 Hindu–Muslim unity
 Phool Walon Ki Sair

References

Further reading
Farooq Abdullah defines ‘Kashmiriat’; 24 March 2009; The Hindu, India's National Newspaper

External links
Kashmiriat
Kashmiri literature and Kashmiriyat
Nandimarg and Kashmiriyat
Spirit of Kashmiriat

Indian philosophy
Indian culture
Culture of Kashmir
Religion in Jammu and Kashmir
Hinduism and Islam